In the context of the Semantic Web, Ontology versioning is the process of formally distinguishing between different versions of vocabularies.

References 

 Michel Klein, Dieter Fensel. Ontology versioning on the Semantic Web. In Proceedings of the International Semantic Web Working Symposium (SWWS). Stanford University, 2001. [CiteSeer]
 
 *Ontology versioning on the Semantic Web

External links 
KWTR: ontology versioning

Ontology (information science)